Frank Barrett (born 9 October 1953 in Panteg, Monmouthshire, Wales) is a travel writer, editor and author. He worked for The Mail on Sunday in London from May 1994 until September 2018.

Background 
Born in Pontypool, his father was a policeman and he spent most of his childhood living in the Police Station, Tintern in the Wye Valley. He was educated at Monmouth School and the Polytechnic of North London.

He is married with two children.

Career
After graduation Barrett worked as a trainee at Travel Trade Gazette for three years. After two years at Business Traveller magazine and three years freelancing for the Sunday Times Magazine, Daily Telegraph and other publications he was the first Travel Editor of The Independent newspaper when it was launched in 1986.

He became Travel Editor of The Mail on Sunday in 1994, and Simon Calder took over for him at the Independent. He won the 1989 British Press Travel Writer of the Year award and was nominated on a further three occasions.

His work includes writing about Long Island, New York His descriptions of Amityville drew objections.

Bibliography

References

1953 births
English newspaper editors
English male journalists
Living people